During the 1946–47 English football season, Everton F.C. competed in the Football League First Division.

Final league table

Results

Football League First Division

FA Cup

Squad

References

Everton F.C. seasons
Everton